The 1st constituency of Mayotte is a French legislative constituency on the island of Mayotte.

Deputies

Election results

2022

2018 by-election result

2017 election result

2012

2007

2002

See also
 Politics of Mayotte

References

Sources
 French Interior Ministry results website: 

French legislative constituencies